Max Walef Araújo da Silva (born 23 October 1993) is a Brazilian professional footballer who plays as a goalkeeper for the club SC Dnipro-1.

Professional career
Walef has spent most of his professional career as the third, and sometimes fourth goalkeeper of Fortaleza having joined them in 2009. Walef made his professional debut with Fortaleza in a 2-1 Campeonato Brasileiro Série B win over São Bento on 25 September 2018.

Career statistics

Honours
Fortaleza
Campeonato Brasileiro Série B: 2018
Campeonato Cearense: 2015, 2016, 2019, 2020, 2021, 2022
Copa do Nordeste: 2019, 2022

References

External links
 
 

1993 births
Living people
People from Teresina
Brazilian footballers
Association football goalkeepers
Fortaleza Esporte Clube players
SC Dnipro-1 players
Campeonato Brasileiro Série A players
Campeonato Brasileiro Série B players
Ukrainian Premier League players
Brazilian expatriate footballers
Expatriate footballers in Ukraine
Brazilian expatriate sportspeople in Ukraine
Sportspeople from Piauí